James Dickinson (born 14 September 1998) is a Scottish cricketer. He made his List A debut for Leicestershire against India A in a tri-series warm-up match on 19 June 2018.

References

External links
 

1998 births
Living people
Scottish cricketers
Leicestershire cricketers
Cricketers from Edinburgh